Levica may refer to:

 The Left, a political party in North Macedonia
 The Left, a political party in Slovenia

See also
 The Left (Levice), a political party in Czech Republic
 The Left (Lewica), a political party in Poland
 Left-wing politics